Queen Merytre-Hatshepsut (or sometimes Hatshepsut-Meryet-Ra) became the principal wife of Pharaoh Thutmose III after the death of Satiah. She was also the daughter of Adoratrix Huy and the mother of Amenhotep II.

Family
Merytre-Hatshepsut was of noble birth. She was possibly the daughter of the Adoratrix Huy, whose statue in the British Museum (EA 1280) shows Huy holding a grandchild and represents the other children of Thutmose III and Merytre-Hatshepsut along the sides of her seated statue. She was the mother of Pharaoh Amenhotep II, Prince Menkheperre, and the princesses Nebetiunet, Merytamun C, Merytamun D, and Iset.

Biography
Merytre-Hatshepsut is known to have held the titles Hereditary Princess (iryt-p`t), Sole One, Great of Praises (wrt-hzwt-w’tit), King’s Mother (mwt-niswt), Lady of The Two Lands (nbt-t3wy), King’s Wife (hmt-nisw), Great King’s Wife (hmt-niswt-wrt), God’s Wife (hmt-ntr), God’s Hand (djrt-ntr).

Merytre-Hatshepsut became a Great Royal Wife after the death of queen Satiah. She is attested in the mortuary temple of Thutmose III in Medinet Habu. The queen is depicted standing behind a seated Tuthmosis III. She's depicted in full Queenly regalia, including the vulture cap, modius with double plumes and the fly-whisk. She is called "great royal wife".

Merytre-Hatshepsut is depicted in several tombs, including that of her husband Tuthmosis III (KV34). On one of the pillars the queen, identified as Merytre, is one of three queens following Thutmose III. Merytre is followed by queen Satiah, Queen Nebtu and Princess Nefertari.

In the tomb of Ra (TT72) in Thebes. Merytre Hatshepsut is depicted seated next to / behind her son Amenhotep II. A scene in another tomb in Sheikh Abd el-Qurna seems to depict a statue of Merytre-Hatshepsut that is shown in a small structure on a sled. The other statues depicted all represent Tuthmosis III. A stela (borne by the statue of a courtier) depicts Merytre-Hatshepsut standing before Tuthmosis III. The Queen is shown wearing a modius and double plumes. She is shown holding a fly-whisk in one hand and an ankh in the other.

Death and burial
Merytre-Hatshepsut was originally meant to be interred in KV42. Foundation deposits were found in 1921 which clearly establish that the tomb was originally meant for her. She may have been buried in KV35, the tomb of her son Amenhotep II however. KV42 may have been reused for the Theban Mayor Sennefer and his wife Senetnay. The non-use of her tomb at KV42 may indicate her disgrace at the time of her grandson.

References

External links
Merytre-Hatshepsut (webpage by Anneke Bart)

15th-century BC Egyptian women
15th-century BC clergy
Princesses of the Eighteenth Dynasty of Egypt
Queens consort of the Eighteenth Dynasty of Egypt
Wives of Thutmose III
Priestesses of the Eighteenth Dynasty of Egypt